Amsterdam Sloterdijk is a major railway junction to the west of Amsterdam Centraal station. It is at a rail-rail crossing, with an additional chord (Hemboog). It is on the railway line from Amsterdam Centraal to Haarlem and the last station before the junction where the line Amsterdam Centraal-Zaandam diverges from it and on the crossing west branch of the Amsterdam–Schiphol railway line between Schiphol and Amsterdam Centraal.

The Hemboog chord connects the crossing lines, providing a direct connection between Schiphol and Zaandam. There are platforms at both crossing lines and at the Hemboog; for the latter there is a separate entrance on another side of the station square.

There are two lines of the Amsterdam Metro that stop here.

History
The original Amsterdam Sloterdijk station was opened in 1956 just south of the current station. Sloterdijk was then just a small village. From there, one could travel to Haarlem; the line to Zaandam took a more northeasterly route via the Hembrug.

In 1983, the line to Zaandam was rerouted via the Hemtunnel, and the current station was opened, initially with the name Sloterdijk Noord. The old station was renamed to Sloterdijk Zuid and closed in 1985, when the line to Haarlem was rerouted via the current station, which was renamed to Sloterdijk at the same time. The platforms for both lines are at the lower level.

In 1986, the Amsterdam-Schiphol line was opened, with platforms at the upper level. The Hemboog, connecting Schiphol to Zaandam, was opened in 2003 but had no platforms at Sloterdijk until they were opened on 14 December 2008, with a separate entrance.

Accidents and incidents
On 21 April 2012, two passenger trains collided head-on between Amsterdam Centraal railway station and Sloterdijk railway station, injuring 117 people. The cause of the accident was the driver of one of the trains passing a signal at danger.
On 14 December 2016, a Sprinter train was evacuated at the station due to a fire in a toilet. Arson is suspected to be the cause.

Station layout
At the ground level is the railway from Amsterdam to Haarlem and Zaandam, with branches to Alkmaar, Purmerend, and Hoorn; at elevated level is the railway from Amsterdam to Amsterdam Airport Schiphol (and thence to Leiden and The Hague). The booking hall is at an intermediate raised level (as too, is the station square). On the south-west side of the crossing and beside the station square runs the Hemboog chord, connecting Schiphol and Amsterdam Lelylaan to Zaandam. The platforms on the Hemboog are numbered platforms 9 and 10.

Train services
As of 9 December 2018, the following train services call at this station:

National Rail

Amsterdam Metro
Amsterdam Sloterdijk is also a station on the Amsterdam Metro lines 50 and 51. This metro service was opened in 1997. It runs next to the railway line for Sloterdijk to Holendrecht.

Tram service
The tram service departs from the ground floor bus station which opened in December 2010, known as the Carrascoplein.

GVB operates 1 tram service to Sloterdijk.

Bus services
Bus services operated by GVB, EBS and Connexxion depart from the ground floor bus station which opened in December 2010, known as the Carrascoplein.

Short-distance services

Long-distance services

* = Requested stop

Gallery

References

External links

 Connexxion bus at the new bus station (from flickr)
 Tram at the new tram stop (from flickr)
 Lockerpoint Luggage Storage Sloterdijk

1983 establishments in the Netherlands
Sloterdijk
Tram stops in Amsterdam
Sloterdijk
Railway stations on the Oude Lijn
Railway stations on the Staatslijn K
Railway stations on the Westtak Ringspoorbaan
Railway stations opened in 1983
Railway stations in the Netherlands opened in the 20th century